Peter Wilson Raffan (1863 – 23 June 1940) was a British Liberal politician.
Raffan came from Newbridge, Monmouthshire, and in 1910  was chairman of the Monmouthshire County Council. When a general election was called in January 1910, P W Raffan was selected as Liberal candidate for Leigh in south Lancashire. John Brunner, the sitting Liberal Member of Parliament, had chosen to stand in Northwich.

The constituency contained a large number of coalminers, and Raffan was opposed not only by the Conservatives, but by Thomas Greenall of the Labour Party, who was a leader of the Lancashire and Cheshire Miners' Federation. Leigh was one of the few seats where Labour and Liberals ran against each other. Raffan won the seat easily. In the Commons Raffan became secretary of the Land Values Group who sought reform in property taxation. He supported women's suffrage, disestablishment of the Church in Wales and the temperance movement.

At the 1918 general election Raffan was re-elected at Leigh as a Liberal and received the "coupon" despite being an opponent of the Coalition Government. At the 1922 election he stood unsuccessfully for election as a Liberal at Ayr Burghs.

At the succeeding 1923 general election he successfully contested Edinburgh North for the Liberals, unseating the Unionist MP, Patrick Johnstone Ford. He only held the seat for one year, with Ford regaining the seat in the 1924 general election.

References

External links 
 

1863 births
1940 deaths
Members of the Parliament of the United Kingdom for English constituencies
Scottish Liberal Party MPs
Liberal Party (UK) MPs for English constituencies
National Liberal Party (UK, 1922) politicians
UK MPs 1910
UK MPs 1910–1918
UK MPs 1918–1922
UK MPs 1923–1924
Members of the Parliament of the United Kingdom for Edinburgh constituencies
Members of the Parliament of the United Kingdom for Leigh